Gamelia septentrionalis is a moth of the  family Saturniidae. It is found in Central America, including Costa Rica and Nicaragua.

The larvae feed on Guatteria diospyroides, Clethra unnata, Dipteryx panamensis, Inga species, Senna fruticosa and Miriocarpa longipes.

References

Moths described in 1936
Hemileucinae